3-dehydroshikimate dehydratase is an enzyme with systematic name 3-dehydroshikimate hydro-lyase. This enzyme catalyses the following chemical reaction

 3-dehydro-shikimate  3,4-dihydroxybenzoate + H2O

This enzyme catalyses an early step in the biosynthesis of petrobactin.

References

External links 
 

EC 4.2.1